Thakurgaon-2 is a constituency represented in the Jatiya Sangsad (National Parliament) of Bangladesh since 1986 by Dabirul Islam of the Awami League.

Boundaries 
The constituency encompasses Baliadangi and Haripur upazilas and two union parishads of Ranisankail Upazila: Dharmaghar, and Kashipur.

History 
The constituency was created in 1984 from the Dinajpur-4 constituency when the former Dinajpur District was split into three districts: Panchagarh, Thakurgaon, and Dinajpur.

Members of Parliament

Elections

Elections in the 2010s 
Dabirul Islam was re-elected unopposed in the 2014 general election after opposition parties withdrew their candidacies in a boycott of the election.

Elections in the 2000s

Elections in the 1990s

References

External links
 

Parliamentary constituencies in Bangladesh
Thakurgaon District